The R520 is a Regional Route in South Africa.

Route
It starts in the town of Mookgophong from the R101 and runs north-west to the village of Vanalphensvlei.

References 

Regional Routes in Limpopo